Live Desire is the Finnish rock band Smack's first live album. It was released in 1986. It was recorded in September 1986 from two live performances in Finland at the legendary  Tavastia Club in Helsinki and in Hamina, Husulas Casino, Finland.

Track list 

 "Some Fun"
 "(I Think I'm Gonna) Buy This Town"
 "Run Rabbit Run"
 "Pass That Bottle"
 "Walkin' On The Wire"
 "Cemetery Walls"
 "Somewhere Out Of The Day"
 "Maggie McGill"
 "Ten Foot Cell"
 "Good Mornin' Headache"
 "Rattlesnake Bite"
 "Black Bird"
 "Search And Destroy"

Line-up 
 Claude - vocals
 Manchuria - guitar
 Rane - guitar
 Jimi Sero - bass
 Kinde - drums

References

External links 
 Smack

Smack (Finnish band) albums
1986 live albums